Marie Wattel (born 2 June 1997) is a French swimmer. She competed in the women's 100 metre butterfly event at the 2016 Summer Olympics. She qualified to represent France at the 2020 Summer Olympics. At the 2022 World Aquatics Championships, she won the silver medal in the 100 metre butterfly with a time of 56.14 seconds.

References

External links
 

1997 births
Living people
French female butterfly swimmers
French female freestyle swimmers
Olympic swimmers of France
Swimmers at the 2016 Summer Olympics
Swimmers at the 2020 Summer Olympics
Swimmers at the 2018 Mediterranean Games
Sportspeople from Lille
European Aquatics Championships medalists in swimming
Mediterranean Games gold medalists for France
Mediterranean Games silver medalists for France
Mediterranean Games bronze medalists for France
Mediterranean Games medalists in swimming
World Aquatics Championships medalists in swimming
20th-century French women
21st-century French women